William Henry Davies (23 June 1831 – 21 April 1921) was a British-born Canadian businessman who established a company that packed and shipped salt pork from Toronto to the United Kingdom. The William Davies Company grew to be the largest pork packer in the British Empire, giving Toronto its nickname of "Hogtown", and introducing peameal bacon.

Life and career
Davies was born in Wallingford, England, the son of Charles Davies and Rachel Smallbone. He left school at 12 to become an apprentice. Within a decade, he had his own meat-curing and retail business in Reading, England. Davies married Emma Holtby in 1853, and the two immigrated to Toronto in 1854.

He started the William Davies Company in 1857. In 1860, he began exporting bacon to England. In 1864, Davies had his own building for cutting and smoking meats. In 1874, a new building was built near the mouth of the Don River.

In 1892, Davies took on Joseph Flavelle as a partner in the business. The partnership flourished to the point where the business slaughtered 500,000 pigs per year, and the two became millionaires.

In 1909, Davies retired from the business, but he retained a share of the company. In 1919, Davies' grandson Edward Carey Fox bought the company, but it later faltered and was merged into Canada Packers (now Maple Leaf Foods) in 1927.

Once one of Canada's largest food producers, the William Davies Company not only graced its home city with the "Hogtown" nickname (or epithet), but William Davies also introduced peameal bacon, which continues to be popular in Canada.

References

Notes

1831 births
1921 deaths
Canadian businesspeople
People from Wallingford, Oxfordshire
People from Old Toronto